Lac Ste. Thérèse is a lake in geographic Casgrain Township, Cochrane District in Northeastern Ontario, Canada. It is in the Moose River drainage basin, and is located at the northern terminus of Ontario Highway 583 at the community of Lac-Sainte-Thérèse.

The primary inflow, at the southwest, is Ste.-Thérèse Creek. The primary outflow, at the northeast, is the Pivabiska Narrows, which flows via Lac Pivabiska, the Pivabiska River, the Missinaibi River and the Moose River to James Bay.

Tributaries
Ste.-Thérèse Creek

See also
List of lakes in Ontario

References

Other map sources:

Lakes of Cochrane District